KSD (93.7 MHz, "93.7 The Bull") is a country music radio station in St. Louis, Missouri.  It is owned by iHeartMedia, Inc., with studios on Highlands Plaza Drive in St. Louis, south of Forest Park.  KSD carries two nationally syndicated iHeartRadio programs on weekdays, The Bobby Bones Show in morning drive time and After MidNite with Granger Smith overnight.  KSD is unusual as an FM station with only three letters in its call sign.  It inherited its call letters from its former sister station, KSD 550 AM, now KTRS, which originated in the earliest days of broadcasting.

KSD has an effective radiated power (ERP) of 74,000 watts.  The transmitter is in Resurrection Cemetery in Shrewsbury, amid the towers for other FM and TV stations.  KSD broadcasts using HD Radio technology, formerly carrying iHeartRadio's classic country music service on its HD2 digital subchannel.

History

KCFM
On , the station signed on the air.  Its original call sign was KCFM.  KCFM was owned by the Commercial Broadcasting Company and broadcast from the Boatmen's Bank Building.  

Its studios and transmitter moved to 532 DeBaliviere Avenue in 1959.  For much of the 1960s and 70s, KCFM broadcast a beautiful music format, playing quarter hour sweeps of soft instrumental cover versions of popular songs with occasional middle of the road vocals.

KSD-FM
Combined Communications bought KCFM in 1978.  The company also owned KSD 550 AM (now KTRS).  Combined Communications relaunched KCFM as an adult contemporary music station.  To trade on its AM station's well-known call letters, on July 10, 1980, KCFM became KSD-FM.  KSD-FM evolved into a hybrid of AC music and Adult Top 40 hits (also known as Hot AC).  It used the moniker "KS94 FM". 

Then, in August 1987, KSD-FM dropped the Hot AC format for Classic rock as "The New 93.7 KSD-FM."  That format lasted until January 1999, when KSD-FM briefly went back to Hot AC as "Mix 93.7".

Country Music
At noon on October 9, 2000, KSD-FM switched to country music as "93.7 The Bull", soon after 106.5 WKKX ("Kix 106") dropped country to become WSSM, "Smooth Jazz 106.5", now WARH.  Due to a big ownership shakeup in 2000, Bonneville Radio ended up owning both competing St. Louis country stations.  With 106.5 playing Smooth Jazz, that opened up a spot for a competitor to longtime country station 92.3 WIL-FM, also owned by Bonneville. 

The first song on "The Bull" was "The Thunder Rolls" by Garth Brooks.  Since then, KSD-FM and WIL-FM compete for St. Louis country music listeners, with each station trading the lead in the Nielsen ratings.

References

External links
93.7 The Bull

SD
Radio stations established in 1955
IHeartMedia radio stations